3rd Division may refer to:

Air divisions 
3d Air Division, United States
3d Attack Wing, United States

Armoured divisions 
3rd Armoured Division (Australia)
3rd Armored Division (France)
3rd Light Mechanized Division (France)
3rd Panzer Division (Wehrmacht)
3rd Panzer Division (Bundeswehr)
3rd SS Panzer Division Totenkopf, Nazi Germany
3rd Tank Division (Imperial Japanese Army)
3rd Armored Division (Jordan)
3rd Division (Nigeria)
3rd Tank Division (Soviet Union)
3rd Armored Division (United States)

Cavalry divisions 
3rd Cavalry Division (German Empire)
3rd Cavalry Division (Reichswehr), Weimar Republic
3rd Light Division (Wehrmacht)
3rd Cavalry Division Amedeo Duca d'Aosta, Italian Army during World War II
3rd Cavalry Division (United Kingdom)
3rd Mounted Division, United Kingdom
3rd Cavalry Division (United States)

Infantry divisions 
3rd (Lahore) Division, of the British Indian Army before and during World War I
3rd Algerian Infantry Division, France
3rd Alpine Division Julia, Italy
3rd Blackshirt Division (21 April), a Black Shirt militia division of Italy
3rd Canadian Division
3rd Carpathian Rifle Division (Poland)
3rd Colonial Infantry Division (France)
3rd Division (Australia)
3rd Division (Colombia)
3rd Division (Estonia)
3rd Division (German Empire)
3rd Division (Imperial Japanese Army)
3rd Division (Iraq)
3rd Division (Japan), Japan Ground Self-Defense Force
3rd Division (New Zealand)
3rd Division (North Korea)
3rd Division (Norway)
3rd Division (1st Formation)(People's Republic of China)
3rd Division (Reichswehr), Weimar Republic
3rd Division (Singapore)
3rd Division (South Sudan)
3rd Division (South Vietnam)
3rd Division (United Kingdom)
3rd Division (Vietnam)
3rd Guards Division (Imperial Japanese Army)
3rd Guards Motor Rifle Division
3rd Infantry Division (Greece)
3rd Infantry Division (Philippines)
3rd Infantry Division (South Africa)
3rd Infantry Division (South Korea)
3rd Infantry Division (United States)
3rd Infantry Division (Wehrmacht), subsequently redesignated the 3rd Motorized Infantry Division, then the 3rd Panzergrenadier Division
3rd Lahore Divisional Area, of the British Indian Army during World War I
3rd Legions Infantry Division (Poland)
3rd Marine Division (United States)
3rd Motor Rifle Division (Soviet Union)
3rd Mountain Infantry Division Ravenna, Italy
3rd Rifle Division (Soviet Union)
3rd Special Forces Division (Greece)
Finnish 3rd Division (Continuation War)
Finnish 3rd Division (Winter War)
3rd Indian Infantry Division, official designation for the Chindits

See also 
Third Division (disambiguation)